Elections of the Dutch Senate were held on 29 May 2007, following the provincial elections on 7 March 2007. The 564 members of the twelve States-Provincial elected the 75 Senate members. The new Senate was installed on 12 June 2007.

Prominent Candidates
Prominent PvdA member and former MP Klaas de Vries was put on a very low place on the PvdA list of candidates by the advisory committee, he was unlikely to be elected. After some internal consternation the congress however decided to place him on an eligible place. He was indeed elected

Another prominent candidate was human-rights lawyer Britta Böhler, who stood successfully for the GreenLeft.

Results

Seat allocation
Three combined lists entered the election, the CDA together with the ChristianUnion and the SGP, the VVD together with D66 and the OSF and the GreenLeft together with the PvdD. The plans for a combined list of PvdA/SP/GreenLeft/PvdD failed because of the rising tensions between SP and PvdA.

Two parties profited from the remainder seat allocation, using D'Hondt method, the SP and the CDA. These are therefore slightly overrepresented.

In North Holland one GreenLeft member of the provincial council voted incorrectly: in a panic attack she made all nine boxes of GreenLeft MPs red. This meant that the combined list of the GreenLeft and the Party for the Animals got one seat less, which would otherwise have been allocated in the remainder seat distribution. This seat would have gone to the PvdD.

Five candidates were elected because of preference votes. Düzgün Yildirim for the SP, Hans Engels for D66, Jan Laurier for the GreenLeft, Joyce Sylvester for the CDA and Hans Klein Breteler for the CDA.

2007
Senate